The 2008 AFC Beach Soccer Championship, also known as the 2008 FIFA Beach Soccer World Cup qualifiers for (AFC), was the third beach soccer championship for Asia, held in May 2008, in Dubai, United Arab Emirates.
The United Arab Emirates won the championship, with Japan finishing second and Iran winning the third place-play off, to claim third. The three teams moved on to play in the 2008 FIFA Beach Soccer World Cup in Marseille, France, from July 17 – July 28.

Participating nations

Group stage

Group A

Group B

Knockout stage

Winners

Final standings

References 

Beach Soccer Championship
AFC Beach Soccer Championship
International association football competitions hosted by the United Arab Emirates
Beach
2008 in beach soccer